Charles Clarence Butt (born February 3, 1938) is an American heir and billionaire. He inherited his family's San Antonio–based H-E-B supermarket chain in 1971. The privately held company has more than 300 stores and $31 billion in sales, according to Forbes.

Early life
Charles Clarence Butt was born on February 3, 1938, the son of Howard Edward Butt Sr. and Mary Elizabeth Holdsworth, and the grandson of Florence Butt, who founded H-E-B in 1905.

Butt graduated from University of Pennsylvania's Wharton School with a bachelor's degree, where he joined the Sigma Chi Fraternity.  He earned an MBA from Harvard Business School.

Career
He became chairman, CEO and president of the H.E. Butt Grocery Company in 1971.

In late 2019, Charles Butt and Family had a net worth of over US$10 billion according to Forbes.

Awards and recognition
In 2013, AdvisoryCloud ranked Butt as the No. 5 CEO on its Top Chief Executive List.

In November 2001, the Mexican government awarded Butt the Aguila Azteca medal for his philanthropic involvement and business dealings in Mexico.

Philanthropy
Butt pledged $50 million to the Raising Texas Teachers scholarship fund to support the training of Texas public school teachers.

In January 2017, he pledged $100 million to Texas public education and created The Holdsworth Center, named after his mother Mary Elizabeth Butt (née Holdsworth). 

In September 2017, Butt donated $5 million to J. J. Watt's Houston Hurricane Harvey relief fund.

As of May 2018, Butt pledges to The Giving Pledge and writes in his release that he intends to help children and teachers.

Personal life
Butt is single.  Butt and his family were excluded from the annual Forbes list of the world's top billionaires beginning in 2016. The magazine changed its methodology to exclude individuals from families that share their fortunes.

References

1938 births
20th-century American businesspeople
21st-century philanthropists
American billionaires
American chief executives of food industry companies
American grocers
Butt family
Giving Pledgers
Harvard Business School alumni
Living people
Wharton School of the University of Pennsylvania alumni